This is a list of schools in North Somerset in the English county of Somerset.

State-funded schools

Primary schools

All Saints CE Primary School, Clevedon
Ashcombe Primary School, Weston-super-Mare
Backwell CE Junior School, Backwell
Banwell Primary School, Banwell
Becket Primary School, Worle
Birdwell Primary School, Long Ashton
Blagdon Primary School, Blagdon
Bournville Primary School, Weston-super-Mare
Burrington CE Primary School, Burrington
Castle Batch Primary School Academy, Worle
Chestnut Park Primary, North End
Christ Church CE Primary School, Weston-super-Mare
Churchill CE Primary School, Lower Langford
Corpus Christi RC Primary School, Weston-super-Mare
Court de Wyck Church School, Claverham
Crockerne CE Primary School, Pill
Dundry CE Primary School, Dundry
Flax Bourton CE Primary School, Flax Bourton
Golden Valley Primary School, Nailsea
Grove Junior School, Nailsea
Hannah More Infant School, Nailsea
Haywood Village Academy, Weston-super-Mare
Herons' Moor Academy, Weston-super-Mare
High Down Infant School, Portishead
High Down Junior School, Portishead
Hutton CE Primary School, Hutton
Kewstoke Primary School, Kewstoke
Kingshill Church School, Nailsea
Locking Primary School, Locking
Mary Elton Primary School, Clevedon
Mead Vale Community Primary School, Worle
Mendip Green Primary School, Worle
Milton Park Primary School, Milton
Northleaze CE Primary School, Long Ashton
Oldmixon Primary School, Oldmixon
Parklands Educate Together Primary, Weston-super-Mare
Portishead Primary School, Portishead
St Andrew's CE Primary School, Congresbury
St Anne's Church Academy, Puxton
St Francis RC Primary School, Nailsea
St Georges Church School, St Georges
St John the Evangalist Church School, Clevedon
St Joseph's RC Primary School, Portishead
St Mark's Ecumenical CE/Methodist Primary School, Worle
St Martin's CE Primary School, Worle
St Mary's CE Primary School, Portbury
St Nicholas Chantry CE Primary School, Clevedon
St Peter's CE Primary School, Portishead
Sandford Primary School, Sandford
Tickenham CE Primary School, Tickenham
Trinity Anglican-Methodist Primary School, Portishead
Uphill Village Academy, Uphill
Walliscote Primary School, Weston-super-Mare
West Leigh Infant School, Backwell
Windwhistle Primary School, Weston-super-Mare
Winford CE Primary School, Winford
Winscombe Primary School, Winscombe
Worle Village Primary School, Worle
Worlebury St Pauls CE First School, Weston-super-Mare
Wraxall CE Primary School, Wraxall
Wrington CE Primary School, Wrington
Yatton CE Junior School, Yatton
Yatton Infant School, Yatton
Yeo Moor Primary School, Clevedon

Secondary schools

Backwell School, Backwell
Broadoak Academy, Weston-super-Mare
Churchill Academy, Churchill
Clevedon School, Clevedon
Gordano School, Portishead
Hans Price Academy, Weston-super-Mare
Nailsea School, Nailsea
Priory Community School, Weston-super-Mare
St Katherine's School, Ham Green
Winterstoke Hundred Academy, Weston-super-Mare
Worle Community School, Worle

Special and alternative schools
Baytree School, Weston-super-Mare
Lime Hills Academy, Nailsea
Ravenswood School, Nailsea
Voyage Learning Campus, Milton
Westhaven School, Uphill

Further education
Weston College, Weston-super-Mare

Independent schools

Primary and preparatory schools
Ashbrooke House School, Weston-super-Mare
Downs Preparatory School, Wraxall
Fairfield School, Backwell

Senior and all-through schools
Sidcot School, Winscombe

Special and alternative schools
Seven Hills, Clevedon

Sources

See also
 List of schools in Somerset

References

North Somerset
 North Somerset
Schools in North Somerset